The Big 5 is an informal association of college athletic programs in Philadelphia, Pennsylvania. It is not a conference, but rather a group of NCAA Division I basketball schools who compete for the city’s collegiate championship.

The Big 5 originally consisted of the University of Pennsylvania, La Salle University, Saint Joseph's University, Temple University, and Villanova University. According to a January 2023 report by The Athletic, at the start of the 2023-24 season, Drexel will be joining the Big 5, which will be renamed the Philly Six. Drexel, La Salle, Penn, Saint Joseph's, and Temple are located in Philadelphia proper and Villanova is in a nearby Main Line campus.

Big 5 schools represent some of the oldest and most successful men's basketball programs in the nation. Four of the five teams—Temple (5th), Villanova (19th), Penn (22nd), and Saint Joseph's (47th)—are in the top-50 for all-time Division I basketball victories. From 1977 to 2022, at least one team from the Big 5 made it to the NCAA Tournament. 

Each year the Herb Good Basketball Club selects All-Big 5 teams, as well as a coach of the year, and the most outstanding player in Big 5 competition receives the Robert V. Geasey Trophy.

The Big 5 creed reads: "They say there's no trophy for winning the Big Five. They must not be from Philadelphia."

History

Big 5 (1955-2022)
The Big 5 was formed in 1955 a year after La Salle won the 1954 NCAA Men's Division I Basketball Tournament. The group showcased Philadelphia's basketball talent and helped pay for the upkeep on the Palestra, on the University of Pennsylvania's campus where the games historically took place. Games were scheduled as double or triple-headers. All schools agreed to split ticket and concessions revenues equally once Penn was paid for upkeep costs on the Palestra. The arrangement promoted already intense intra-city collegiate basketball rivalries dating back three decades or more.

During the heyday of the Big 5, many major college programs, especially in the northeastern United States, were independents. As the Big East and Atlantic 10 conferences expanded to cover most of the Northeast (Villanova joined the Big East, while Temple, St. Joseph's, and La Salle joined the Atlantic 10, the University of Pennsylvania is a member of the Ivy League), and as college basketball became increasingly driven by television and its need to appeal to a broad national audience, the local character of the Big 5 was a liability. The round-robin series ended in 1991.

However, in 1999, the Big 5 round-robin series was revived and continued until the 2022-23 season. Some things have changed from the series' heyday: the schools no longer evenly split the proceeds from the games, and La Salle, Temple, St. Joe's, and Villanova do not always use the Palestra for their home games in the series.

There are intense rivalries inside the Big 5, most notably the rivalry between Villanova and Saint Joseph's, also known as the Holy War. The St. Joe's–Temple rivalry increased in the early 2000s mostly because of the "Goon Gate" incident in 2005 involving former Temple coach John Chaney, who sent in a player to intentionally foul John Bryant. Bryant's arm was fractured. La Salle considers Saint Joseph's to be its biggest rival.

Philly Six and addition of Drexel (beginning in 2024)

Throughout the Big 5's existence, some suggested adding Drexel. Drexel is a member of the City 6, which is an intra-city intramural competition among the six schools. These talks amplified during the 2006–07 season, as Drexel beat three of the four Big 5 teams it played, but no changes were made. 

In December 2022, The Athletic reported that administrators at the Big 5 schools and Drexel were discussing "trying to find a way to resuscitate the Big 5." The meetings came after a sparsely attended Big 5 doubleheader at the Palestra. According to the The Athletic, talks about reforms to the Big 5 began prior to the doubleheader as school administrators felt there was a decline in the series due to Villanova's recent dominance and many of the top local recruits opting not to play college basketball in Philadelphia.

The Big 5 announced in January 2023 that the Big 5 would add Drexel and be renamed the Philly Six. The six teams will be split into two three-team pods, who will play each other in November. On the first Saturday in December, a triple header will be held with a fifth place, third place and championship game being held. Some criticized the move as it eliminated the full round-robin nature of the Big 5 and games will no longer be primarily played at the Palestra. Following the report, the Big 5 released a statement saying that "administrators held discussions about what future possibilities exist. However, no decision has been finalized and conversations are ongoing."

Annual winners

Men

All Big 5 men's basketball teams play each other once per season for a total of four games per team. Currently La Salle and St. Joe's meet twice per season since they both share a conference. If two or more Big 5 teams do share a conference, the second matchup between the schools is counted toward the Big 5 standings while the first matchup is not.  There is no season-ending Big 5 Tournament, so a "champion" of the unofficial athletics group is determined by a round-robin tournament. Since 1956 there have been three instances of a five-way tie among all member schools, which occurred in 1980–81 (2–2 records), 1991–92 (1–1 records), and 1997–98 (1–1 records), though the latter two cases were during the period when there was no round-robin format, so not every team played all four other teams.

Most championships

Asterisk (*) denotes shared championship
Bold denotes all five schools tied

List of national championships

NCAA tournament

National Invitation Tournament

Women
All Big 5 women's basketball teams play each other once per season for a total of four games per team. Currently La Salle and St. Joe's meet twice per season since they both share a conference. If two or more Big 5 teams do share a conference, the second matchup between the schools is counted toward the Big 5 standings while the first matchup is not.  There is no season-ending Big 5 Tournament, so a "champion" of the unofficial athletics group is determined by a round-robin tournament. Since 1979 there have been four instances of a three-way tie among all member schools and four instances of a two-way tie. Due to COVID-19 the complete round robin tournament is not contested in 2020-2021 and 2021-2022 season.

Other uses
Although known primarily of an association of Philadelphia sports teams, students from the Big 5 also coordinate frequent student government meetings. The governments consist of La Salle, the University of Pennsylvania, Temple, Saint Joseph's, and Drexel University instead of Villanova. Drexel has representation instead of Villanova since meetings primarily revolve around Philadelphia issues. Villanova is the only Big 5 college not located in the city.

See also

 Mayor's Cup (Temple–Villanova)
 St. Joe's–Temple rivalry
 Holy War (Villanova vs. St. Joe's)

References

External links
 

 
1955 establishments in Pennsylvania
College basketball rivalries in the United States
History of college basketball in the United States
La Salle Explorers basketball
Organizations established in 1955
Penn Quakers basketball
Saint Joseph's Hawks basketball
Sports in Philadelphia
Temple Owls basketball
Villanova Wildcats basketball